Alfred Nelmes (1871 – February 1940) was an English professional footballer who played as a wing half.

References

1871 births
1940 deaths
Footballers from Bristol
English footballers
Association football wing halves
Saltburn F.C. players
Middlesbrough F.C. players
Grimsby Town F.C. players
Burton United F.C. players
Brighton & Hove Albion F.C. players
Ilkeston United F.C. players
Gresley F.C. players
English Football League players